Lago di Pilato (Pilate lake) is a glacial lake located in Sibylline Mountains, among Apennine.

Description
It is located in a narrow glacial valley beneath Mount Vector (2476 m) and Redeemer Peak (2448 m) summits. It is supposed to date back to the superior pleistocene.

The lake takes its name from a legend in which Pontius Pilate was killed there and buried under lake bed as punishment for his role at passion of the Christ time.

Geo-politically the lake is situated in Marche, and it is the sole natural lake of the region (excluding small shoreline lakes), the province is  Ascoli Piceno, and is part of the Monti Sibillini National Park.

During water abundance periods the lake assumes the shape of a pair of eyeglasses while when there is a lack of water it retreats into two smaller pools. For this reason it is nicknamed the lake with glasses".

Endemisms
Chirocephalus marchesonii, a freshwater shrimp is endemic to this lake.

References

Lakes of the Marche
Pontius Pilate